Adwaita (from , meaning "one and only" in Sanskrit) (c. 1750 – 22 March 2006), also spelled Addwaita, was a male Aldabra giant tortoise that lived in the Alipore Zoological Gardens of Kolkata, India. At the time of his death in 2006, Adwaita was believed to be amongst the longest-living animals in the world.

He may have been from Aldabra, an atoll in the Seychelles. This anecdotal report has not been confirmed. The animal was one of four tortoises that lived at Robert Clive's estate at Barrackpore, in the northern suburbs of Calcutta. Clive was said to have received the tortoises following his victory at the Battle of Plassey in 1757, in which the British East India Company defeated the Nawab of Bengal and his French allies, thereby securing India for Britain in the long run.  Adwaita was transferred to the Alipore Zoo in Calcutta in 1875 or 1876 by Carl Louis Schwendler, the founder of the zoo. Adwaita lived in his enclosure in the zoo until his death on 22 March 2006 at an estimated age of 255.

Description
Weighing 250 kg (551 lb), Adwaita was a solitary animal with no records of his progeny. He lived on a diet of wheat bran, carrots, lettuce, soaked gram (chickpea), bread, grass and salt.

Age
His shell cracked in late 2005, and a wound developed in the flesh underneath the crack. The wound became infected and eventually led to his death from liver failure on 22 March 2006. Adwaita is estimated to have been at least 255 years old. If this latter estimate can be confirmed, Adwaita will have been the oldest known tortoise of modern times, living longer than Harriet by 80 years and Tu'i Malila by 67 years.

See also 
Tu'i Malila
Jonathan
List of longest-living organisms

References

External links

1750 animal births
2006 animal deaths
History of Kolkata
Individual tortoises
Individual animals in India
Deaths from liver failure